Depolarization or depolarizer may refer to:

 Depolarization, a decrease in the absolute value of a cell's membrane potential
 Depolarizer, a substance used to depolarize an electrochemical cell
 Depolarization ratio, the intensity ratio between the parallel component and the perpendicular component of Raman scattered light
 Depolarizer (optics), a device for randomizing the polarization of light